Lee Ji-eun (born 18 June 1989) is a South Korean swimmer, who specialized in middle-distance freestyle events. She represented her country South Korea at the 2008 Summer Olympics, and has won two bronze medals in both the 400 m freestyle and the  freestyle relay at the 2006 Asian Games in Doha, Qatar.

Lee competed for the South Korean swimming team in the women's 400 m freestyle at the 2008 Summer Olympics in Beijing. She finished with the fastest final time and a new personal best in 4:19.42 at the Jeju Halla Cup five months earlier in Jeju City, sneaking under the FINA B-standard (4:20.05) by more than half a second. Lee opened up the second heat with an early lead, but faded down the remainder of the race to pick up the fifth spot in 4:21.53. Lee missed a chance to enter the top eight final, as she placed thirty-seventh overall in the prelims.

Google

References

External links
NBC Olympics Profile

1989 births
Living people
Olympic swimmers of South Korea
Swimmers at the 2006 Asian Games
Swimmers at the 2008 Summer Olympics
Asian Games medalists in swimming
South Korean female freestyle swimmers
Sportspeople from Ulsan
Asian Games bronze medalists for South Korea
Medalists at the 2006 Asian Games
20th-century South Korean women
21st-century South Korean women